Carl-Henning Wijkmark (21 November 1934 – 4 September 2020) was a Swedish novelist and translator.  He made his literary debut in 1972, with the novel Jägarna på Karinhall. Among his other novels are Dressinen from 1983 and Sista dagar from 1986. He was awarded the Dobloug Prize in 1986. He received the August Prize in 2007, for his novel Stundande natten.

References

1934 births
2020 deaths
20th-century Swedish novelists
21st-century Swedish novelists
Swedish translators
Dobloug Prize winners
August Prize winners
Swedish male novelists
20th-century translators
20th-century Swedish male writers
21st-century male writers